Baireddipalle (Baireddy Palle) is a Mandal in Palamaner Revenue Division and Chittoor district of the Indian state of Andhra Pradesh. It is the mandal headquarters of Baireddipalle mandal.

Geography 
It is bordered between Karnataka State and Tamil Nadu State borders.

Baireddipalle is about 55 kilometres West of Chittoor Town.

Baireddipalle Mandal is bounded on the South/West by VKota (Venkatagirikota) Mandal, North/East by Palamaner/Gangavaram/Peddapanjani Mandals, South by Tamil Nadu State Border and West by Karnataka State Border.

Baireddipalle Mandal is in Madanapalle Revenue division since the Revenue Mandal Reorganization in 1985.

Chittoor District is in the southernmost part of State so also Rayalaseema Region. Chittoor District is bounded on the North by Ananthapur and Kadapa districts, East [part] by Nellore  district, East [part] &  South Tamil Nadu State and West by  Kolar district of Karnataka  State.

Residents speak Telugu, Urdu, Tamil and Kannada.

Grama Panchayats in Baireddipalle Mandal 
1. Baireddipalle 2. Nellipatla 3. Lakkanapalle 4. Belupalle 5. Theertham 
6. Chappidipalle 7. Devadoddi 8. Pathapeta 9. Dharmapuri 10. Gollacheemanapalle 
11. Kammanapalle 12. Peddachellaragunta 13. Ganginayanipalle 14. Kadapanatham 15. Khambhamapalle 
16. Alapalle 17. Gadduru 18. M.Kothur 19. Pathurnatham 20. Gownithemmepalle

Villages in Baireddipalle Mandal 
 Ala Palle
 Baireddi Palle 
 Belu Palle 
 Chappidi Palle 
 Deva Doddi 
 Dharma Puri 
 Donthi Ralla Palle 
 Gangi Nayani Palle 
 Golla Cheemana Palle 
 Gouni Thimme Palle 
 Kadapa Natham 
 Kaigallu 
 Kambham Palle 
 Kammana Palle 
 Lakkana Palle 
 Meakala Nagireddi Palle 
 Mula Thimme Palle 
 Muraripalle
 Nelli Patla 
 Pathur Natham 
 Pedda Chellara Gunta
 Raghunayakula Dinne 
 Setti Palle 
 Theertham 
 Thimmaiah Gari Palle 
 Veerla Banda

High Schools, with School Code in Baireddipalle Mandal 
28236101309	ZP High School, Baireddipalle (Boys)
28236101311	ZP High School, Baireddipalle (Girls)
28236101312	ZP High School, Baireddipalle (Urdu)
28236101009	ZP High School, Belupalle
28236101502	ZP High School, Kadapanatham
28236100806	ZP High School, Lakkana Palle
28236102305	ZP High School, Nellipatla
28236100106	ZP High School, Peddachallara Gunta
28236100508	ZP High School, Teertham
28236101107	AP Model School, Baireddipalle
28236101313	Kasturba (KGBV) School,	Baireddipalle
28236101106	AP Residential School(Girls) Kammanapalle
28236101314 	Morning Star High School, Baireddipalle
28236101310	Sri Saraswathi High School, Baireddipalle

High School Clusters under Baireddypalle ZP High School 
(1) Baireddipalle (2) Belupalle (3) Kadapanatham (4) Lakkana Palle (5) Nelli Patla (6) Teertham

Post Offices with Baireddipalle Pincode (517415) 
Alapalle 
Dasarlapalle
Kadapanatham 
Lakkanapalle
Peddachellaragunta 
Theertham

Population as of 2011 
Baireddipalle is a large village located in Baireddipalle Mandal of Chittoor district, Andhra Pradesh with total 1582 families residing. The Baireddipalle village has population of 7225 of which 3731 are males while 3494 are females as per Population Census 2011.

In Baireddipalle village population of children with age 0-6 is 815 which makes up 11.28% of total population of village. Average Sex Ratio of Baireddipalle village is 936 which is lower than Andhra Pradesh state average of 993. Child Sex Ratio for the Baireddipalle as per census is 869, lower than Andhra Pradesh average of 939.

Baireddipalle village has higher literacy rate compared to Andhra Pradesh. In 2011, literacy rate of Baireddipalle village was 70.36% compared to 67.02% of Andhra Pradesh. In Baireddipalle Male literacy stands at 79.39% while female literacy rate was 60.80%.

As per constitution of India and Panchyati Raaj Act, Baireddipalle village is administrated by Sarpanch (Head of Village) who is elected representative of village.

Particulars	Total	Male	Female
Total Houses	1,582	-	-
Population	7,225	3,731	3,494
Child (0-6)	815	436	379
Schedule Caste	1,049	562	487
Schedule Tribe	86	58	28
Literacy 70.36%	79.39 % 60.80%
Total Workers	3,038	2,092	946
Main Worker	2,848	-	-
Marginal Worker	190	103	87

As of 2011 Census, The total population of Baireddipalle Mandal is 56,538

Caste Factor 
As of 2011 Census, Schedule Caste (SC) constitutes 14.52% while Schedule Tribe (ST) were 1.19% of total population in Baireddipalle village.

Work Profile
As of 2011 Census, In Baireddipalle village out of total population, 3038 were engaged in work activities. 93.75% of workers describe their work as Main Work (Employment or Earning more than 6 Months) while 6.25% were involved in Marginal activity providing livelihood for less than 6 months. Of 3038 workers engaged in Main Work, 665 were cultivators (owner or co-owner) while 1158 were Agricultural labourers.

References

External links 
 Baireddipalle Weather

Villages in Chittoor district
Mandal headquarters in Chittoor district